The decade of the 1670s in archaeology involved some significant events.

Explorations

Excavations

Finds
 1673: December 11 - Gray's Inn Lane Hand Axe excavated in London and recognised by John Conyers, the first paleolithic artefact to be identified as having human origins. 
 1674: Two skeletons of children are discovered in the White Tower (Tower of London), believed at this time to be the remains of the Princes in the Tower.
 1676: The first fossilised bone of what is now known to be a dinosaur is discovered in England by Robert Plot, the femur of a Megalosaurus from a limestone quarry at Cornwell near Chipping Norton, Oxfordshire.

Events
 1675: March 25 - Loss of HMY Mary off Anglesey.

Births
 1671: January 15 - Abraham de la Pryme, English antiquary (d. 1704).
 1673: November 21 - Nicholas Mahudel, French antiquary (d. 1747).
 1675: June 1 - Francesco Scipione, marchese di Maffei, Italian archaeologist (d. 1755).

Deaths

References

Archaeology by decade
Archaeology